Pierantonio Clementi (born 4 September 1947) is an Italian biathlete. He competed at the 1972 Winter Olympics and the 1976 Winter Olympics.

References

External links
 

1947 births
Living people
Italian male biathletes
Olympic biathletes of Italy
Biathletes at the 1972 Winter Olympics
Biathletes at the 1976 Winter Olympics
People from Schilpario
Sportspeople from the Province of Bergamo